The ISS year-long mission was an 11-month-long scientific research project aboard the International Space Station, which studied the health effects of long-term spaceflight. Astronaut Scott Kelly (ideally suited for the experiment as the identical twin of Mark Kelly) and cosmonaut Mikhail Kornienko spent 340 days in space, with scientists performing medical experiments. Kelly and Kornienko launched on 27 March 2015 on Soyuz TMA-16M along with Gennady Padalka. The mission encompassed Expeditions 43, 44, 45 and 46. The pair safely landed in Kazakhstan on March 2, 2016, returning aboard Soyuz TMA-18M with Sergey Volkov. The mission supported the NASA Twins study, which helps shed light on the health effects of long-duration spaceflight, which is of interest for Mars missions especially.

On 12 April 2019, NASA reported medical results from the NASA Twins Study which demonstrated several long-lasting changes, including those related to alterations in DNA and cognition, when one twin was compared with the other.

Selection

In November 2012, NASA, the Russian Federal Space Agency (Roscosmos), and their international partners selected two veteran spacefarers for a one-year mission aboard the International Space Station in 2015. The mission included collecting scientific data important to future human exploration of the Solar System. Kelly and Korniyenko already had an indirect connection: Kelly was a backup crew member for the station's Expedition 23/24 crews, where Korniyenko served as a flight engineer.

The goal aboard the orbiting laboratory was to understand better how the human body reacts and adapts to the harsh environment of space. Data from the mission was used to improve assessments of crew performance and health. They worked  to develop and validate better countermeasures against the risks associated with future missions around the Moon, asteroids and ultimately Mars.

Results

On 12 April 2019, NASA reported medical results, from the NASA Twins study, which demonstrated several long-lasting changes, including those related to alterations in DNA and cognition, when one twin was compared with the other.

The study also required the astronauts to keep a journal, and investigated the psychological effects of living in a confined space for an extended length of time. Kornienko said of his experiences on Expedition 23/24: "The thing you miss there most of all is the Earth itself, I missed smells. I missed trees, I even dreamt of them. I even hallucinated. I thought I smelled a real fire and something being barbecued on it! I ended up putting pictures of trees on the walls to cheer up. You do miss the Earth there."

Scott stated that he missed feeling changes in the weather while on the ISS.

NASA Twin Study 

Identical twins Mark Kelly and Scott Kelly were studied for changes in the health of a body in space compared to a body on earth. A variety of mechanisms in the human body were analyzed, notably telomere length, body mass, eye and bone deformation, and immune response. The study found no significant changes in T cell production after the first vaccination of the study, nor changes in some other mechanisms, but did find:
"significant changes in multiple data types were observed in association with the spaceflight period; the majority of these eventually returned to a preflight state within the time period of the study. These included changes in telomere length, gene regulation measured in both epigenetic and transcriptional data, gut microbiome composition, body weight, carotid artery dimensions, subfoveal choroidal thickness and peripapillary total retinal thickness, and serum metabolites. In addition, some factors were significantly affected by the stress of returning to Earth, including inflammation cytokines and immune response gene networks, as well as cognitive performance. For a few measures, persistent changes were observed even after 6 months on Earth, including some genes’ expression levels, increased DNA damage from chromosomal inversions, increased numbers of short telomeres, and attenuated cognitive function."

Effect of spaceflight on the human body 

The International Space Station developed exercise equipment, including treadmills and resistance devices to limit muscle atrophy in a low gravity environment. Weightlessness causes body fluids in astronauts to accumulate in the upper half of the body, leading to facial edema and unwelcome side effects. One problem may be the low gravity affecting the body in unforeseen ways and it can be hard to detect the cause and effect of gravity on the body. Space seems to cause trouble for a number of body parts including bone, sometimes the eyes, and a classic problem is space sickness.

Longest time spent in space by other astronauts 

Vladimir Titov and Musa Manarov spent 365 days in space on Mir from December 1987 to December 1988.
Valeri Polyakov spent 437 days on Mir in 1994-1995 and Sergei Avdeyev spent 379 days on Mir in 1998-1999.

Prior to the Year Long Mission, the longest mission on the ISS was 215 days, by Mikhail Tyurin and Michael López-Alegría. Christina Hammock Koch holds the record for the longest single spaceflight by a woman at around 328 days.  In March 2022, NASA's Mark T. Vande Hei and the russian Pyotr Dubrov landed following 355 days in space as part of ISS Expeditions 64/65/66.

See also 
 Scientific research on the International Space Station
 Timeline of longest spaceflights
 Spaceflight records
 Human mission to Mars

References

External links 

 One-Year Mission - NASA
 NASA - One-Year Mission Investigators Debut Preliminary Results at NASA Workshop (January 30, 2017)

Expeditions to the International Space Station
2015 in spaceflight
2016 in spaceflight